Hasanabad-e Olya or Hasan Abad Olya may refer to:
 Hasanabad-e Olya, Fars
 Hasanabad-e Olya, Isfahan
 Hasanabad-e Olya, Kerman, in Baft County
 Hasan Abad Olya, Kerman, in Rafsanjan County
 Hasanabad-e Olya, Kermanshah
 Hasanabad-e Olya, South Khorasan
 Hasanabad-e Olya, West Azerbaijan